Gortnahoe–Glengoole GAA =Kip  is a Gaelic Athletic Association club located in the parish of Gortnahoe–Glengoole in County Tipperary, Ireland, on the border with County Kilkenny. It competes in hurling and Gaelic football in the Mid-Tipperary division of Tipperary GAA. The club was founded in 1886 and owned by Daniel Moore of Moyne-Templetuohy

Hurling

Honours
Tipperary Intermediate Hurling Championship (2): 1988, 2020
Mid-Tipperary Intermediate Hurling Championship (7): 1988, 1999, 2000, 2006, 2008, 2009, 2017;
Mid-Tipperary Junior A Hurling Championship (7): 1955 (Gortnahoe), 1959 (Gortnahoe), 1968, 1972, 1973, 1983, 1986
Mid-Tipperary Junior B Hurling Championship: (3): 2006, 2015, 2020
 Mid Tipperary Under-21 A Hurling Championship: (2): 1985 (as Moyne-Gortnahoe), 1991
 Mid Tipperary Under-21 B Hurling Championship: (5): 1987, 2000, 2004, 2016, 2019
 Tipperary Under-21 B Hurling Championship: (2): 2016, 2019
Mid-Tipperary Minor A Hurling Championship: (1): 1960 (as Glengoole)
Tipperary Minor 'B' Hurling Championship (2): 1986, 1994
Mid Tipperary Minor 'B' Hurling Championship (4): 1986, 1994, 1996, 2016
Mid-Tipperary Junior No. 2 Hurling Championship (3): 1952 (as Gortnahoe), 1958 (as Gortnahoe), 1954 (as Glengoole)

Notable players
 Jack Dunne, All-Ireland medallist 1887
 Pat Fizgerald
 Larry Kiely, Tipperary hurler 1960s and Olympic showjumper
 Pat Leahy, Tipperary hurler, 1887
 Shane Long, Republic of Ireland soccer player
 Johnny Moriarty (Kilkenny)

Gaelic football

Honours
 Mid Tipperary Junior A Football Championship: (1): 2016
 Tipperary Junior B Football Championship: (2): 1996, 2014
 Mid Tipperary Junior B Football Championship: (5): 1993, 1996, 2002, 2011, 2014
 Mid Tipperary Under-21 B Football Championship: (2): 1989, 2003
 Mid Tipperary Minor A Football Championship: (1): 2003
 Mid Tipperary Minor C Football Championship: (1): 2003

Camogie
St Patrick's Camogie Club was founded in 1964 when Glengoole amalgamated with Ballingarry. They went on to win two All-Ireland and three county championships and supplied six of the 12 players on the Tipperary team for the 1965 All-Ireland final.

Following victory in 1966, the club disbanded and the players returned to their original clubs.

Honours
All-Ireland Senior Club Camogie Championship (2): 1965, 1966
Tipperary Senior Camogie Championship (3): 1964, 1965, 1966

References

External links
Tipperary GAA site
GAA Info Profile

Gaelic games clubs in County Tipperary